Frank Fixaris (May 6, 1934 in Torrington, Connecticut – January 13, 2006 in Falmouth, Maine) was an American sportscaster, anchor, reporter, and disc jockey, spending the majority of his career at WGME-TV  in Portland, Maine. He also, along with partner Dave "Shoe" Schumacher, co-hosted a morning radio show on WJAB  after his television run. "Shoe" continues to co-host the show, known as "The Morning Jab", with present partner, Joe Palmieri.

Fixaris attended college in Boston, Massachusetts and graduated from Emerson College  in 1956. He then worked at several radio stations early in his career before taking the job as a sports anchor at WGME in 1965 (then WGAN) and continued there until 1995. He served as sports director there from 1967 until 1992. Coincidentally Fixaris' cousin, former Major League Baseball player Jimmy Piersall, also worked as a sportscaster.

He was the color commentator of the Maine Mariners , and later the Portland Pirates of the American Hockey League. Although offered several network positions (particularly with CBS, as well as the New York Islanders), he chose to remain in Maine. He was co-awarded one of the James H. Ellery Memorial Awards by the AHL for his outstanding work in 1978. In honor of his many years of work with the Mariners/Pirates, the press box at the Cumberland County Civic Center  bears his name as a memorial tribute. A 2006 inductee into the Maine Association of Broadcaster's hall of fame, Fixaris is also remembered annually with an award in his name issued by the Portland Fire Department, as well as two scholarships for students studying communication science at Saint Joseph's College of Maine .

The Fix Cup , a former annual high school hockey tournament in Portland (modeled after the Beanpot tournament), was named after Fixaris.

He was known as having an encyclopedic knowledge of all things sports, especially at the local level. Popular broadcasters Mike Emrick, Dale Arnold, Tom Caron, Scott Wykoff and J.J. Jeffrey considered him as being instrumental in their development.

Fixaris died in a fire at his home on January 13, 2006. He is survived by his wife, Barbara, and a son, Michael. His brother, Richard, died in December, 2013. He is buried at Evergreen Cemetery in Portland, Maine.

1934 births
2006 deaths
American sports announcers
Maine Mariners
Portland Pirates
Emerson College alumni
People from Falmouth, Maine
Burials at Evergreen Cemetery (Portland, Maine)
Radio personalities from Maine